The women's doubles Tournament at the 2007 Barcelona KIA took place between 11 June and 17 June on outdoor clay courts in Barcelona, Spain. Nuria Llagostera Vives and Arantxa Parra Santonja won the title, defeating Lourdes Domínguez Lino and Flavia Pennetta in the final.

Seeds

Draw

References

Main Draw

2007 Doubles
Barcelona KIA - Doubles